Helge Schneider (born 30 August 1955 in Mülheim an der Ruhr) is a German entertainer, comedian, musician, author, film and theatre director, and actor. He frequently appears on German television and is probably best known for his song "Katzeklo" (Kitty Litter Box): "Katzeklo, Katzeklo, ja das macht die Katze froh" ("Kitty litter tray, kitty litter tray, that's what makes the kitty gay [happy]."), which spent 17 weeks on the German music charts in 1994, peaking at number 13.

Discography 

 1987: The Last Jazz
 1989: Seine größten Erfolge (His greatest hits)
 1990: New York, I'm Coming
 1991: Hörspiele Vol.1 (1979–1984) (Radio dramas)
 1992: Hörspiele Vol.2 (1985–1987)
 1992: Guten Tach (Hello there)
 1993: Es gibt Reis, Baby (We're gonna have some rice, baby)
 1995: Es rappelt im Karton (Rumble in the cardboard box)
 1997: Da Humm
 1998: Helge 100% live – The Berlin Tapes (live album)
 1999: Eiersalat in Rock (Egg salad in rock, released as Helge and the Firefuckers)
 1999: Jazz (& Hardcore)
 2000: Hefte raus – Klassenarbeit! (live album; Workbooks out – exam time!)
 2003: Out of Kaktus!
 2004: Füttern verboten (live album; Please don't feed)
 2007: I Brake Together (a complex German-English wordplay: The German expression for I am collapsing (Ich breche zusammen) can be literally translated as I break (not: brake) together)
 2007: Akopalüze Nau (live album; parody of "Apocalypse Now")
 2013: Sommer, Sonne, Kaktus (Summer, sun, cactus)
2014: Live at the Grugahalle – 20 Jahre Katzeklo (Evolution!) (live album)
 2017: Heart Attack No. 1 (feat. Pete York)
 2019: Partypeople (beim Fleischer) (Partypeople (At the Butcher))
2020: Mama

Filmography

As director 
 1982: The Privatier (not published)
 1987: Stangenfieber (Stick fever)
 1993: Texas – Doc Snyder hält die Welt in Atem (Texas – Doc Snyder sets the world aghast)
 1994: 00 Schneider – Jagd auf Nihil Baxter (00 Schneider – The hunt for Nihil Baxter)
 1996: Praxis Dr. Hasenbein (Dr. Hareleg's Practice)
 2004: Jazzclub – Der frühe Vogel fängt den Wurm (Jazzclub – the early bird catches the worm)
 2013: 00 Schneider – Im Wendekreis der Eidechse (The Tropic of Gecko)

As actor 
 1986:  as Johnny Flash
 1994: Felidae as Jesaja (voice only)
 2004: 7 Dwarves – Men Alone in the Wood as "The White (or Wise) Helge"
 2004: Traumschiff Surprise – Periode 1 (singing)
 2007: Mein Führer – Die wirklich wahrste Wahrheit über Adolf Hitler as Adolf Hitler

References

 Helge Schneider at laut.de

External links

 
 
 Review vom Helge Schneider Konzert in Berlin, 4. April 2010

1955 births
Living people
Film directors from North Rhine-Westphalia
German theatre directors
German male comedians
German comedy musicians
German male film actors
German jazz musicians
German multi-instrumentalists
People from Mülheim